Supreme was a subsidiary of the Pama records label. There were a number of reggae releases in the very late-1960s and very early-1970s. The label also released some soul and funk recordings. The label would also release early recordings by John Holt and Bob Marley.

Selected releases
 Mr. Foundation - Time To Pray / Young Budd -  SUP 201 - 1969
 King Chubby - What's The World Coming To / Live As One - PS 297 - 1970
 Sound Dimension, Mr. Foundation - More Games / Maga Dog - SUP 202 - 1970
 The Mohawks - Let It Be / Looking Back - SUP 204 - 1970
 The Mohawks - For Our Liberty / Wicked Lady - SUP 205 - 1970
 The Mohawks - Give Me Some / Give Me Some (Instrumental) - SUP 207 - 1970
 The Mohawks - Funky Funky / Funky Funky (Instrumental) - SUP 208 - 1970
 The Emotions/ Matador Allstars - Hallelujah / Boat Of Joy - SUP 209 - 1970
 The Mediators, Rupie Edwards All Stars - When You Go To A Party / Stop The Party - SUP 210 - 1970
 Al Brown, John Holt - Always / Share My Rest - SUP 212 - 1970
 Bob Marley, Bunny Gale - I Like It Like This / Am Sorry - SUP 216 - 1971
 Ruddy And Sketto - Every Night / ? - SUP 218 - 1971
 Tony Brevett, Brevett All-Stars - Don't Get Weary / Weary (Version) - SUP 224 - 1971
 Eugene And Burst, Denzil* And Burst - Let It Fall / Can't Change - SUP 225 - 1971
 Dave Barker - Double Heavy / Johnny Dollar - SUP 228 - 1971

References

British record labels